KYGT-LP (102.7 FM, "The Goat") is a low-power FM radio station broadcasting a variety format. Licensed to Idaho Springs, Colorado, United States, the station is currently owned by Clear Creek Radio, Inc.

History
The station was assigned the call sign KRIK-LP on 2002-02-05. On 2002-11-05, the station changed its call sign to the current KYGT-LP.

References

External links
 
 

YGT-LP
YGT-LP